Servio Tullio is an opera composed by Agostino Steffani to a libretto by Ventura Terzago based on events in the life of the Roman king Servius Tullius. It was first performed in 1685.

References

Further reading

External links

Cultural depictions of Servius Tullius
1686 operas
Operas by Agostino Steffani